Franco David Moyano (born 13 September 1997) is an Argentine professional footballer who plays as a midfielder for Argentinos Juniors.

Career

Club
Moyano had youth spells with Lobos and San Lorenzo. He started off his senior career with San Lorenzo, first appearing in their squad in 2017 when he was an unused substitute for an Argentine Primera División match with Rosario Central on 10 September. He eventually made his professional debut in January 2018 during a 2–0 loss away to Talleres. On 28 January 2019, Moyano was loaned to Argentinos Juniors for one year, with a purchase option. On 2 January 2020, the loan spell was extended for another six months. In July 2020, the loan spell was extended once again, however, this time with a purchase obligation of $350,000 for 80% of his rights. He became a permanently Argentinos player from 1 January 2022, signing a one-year deal with the club.

International
In 2017, Moyano was called up to the Argentina U20 squad for the 2017 South American Youth Football Championship in Ecuador. He won one cap at the tournament, versus Venezuela on 27 January.

Career statistics
.

References

External links

1997 births
Living people
Footballers from Buenos Aires
Argentine footballers
Argentina youth international footballers
Argentina under-20 international footballers
Association football midfielders
Argentine Primera División players
San Lorenzo de Almagro footballers
Argentinos Juniors footballers